The Buttonwoods Museum is a museum operated by the Haverhill Historical Society in Haverhill, Massachusetts, in the Merrimack Valley.

The museum includes a John Ward House, a Duncan House, and the Daniel Hunkins Shoe Shop.

External links 
 Buttonwoods Museum

Museums in Essex County, Massachusetts
Open-air museums in Massachusetts
History museums in Massachusetts
Buildings and structures in Haverhill, Massachusetts